= Albert Casullo =

American philosopher

Education
- Education: Syracuse University (BA); University of Iowa (PhD)

Philosophical work
- Era: Contemporary philosophy
- Region: Western philosophy
- Institutions: University of Nebraska–Lincoln
- Main interests: A priori knowledge, modal knowledge, intuitions

Albert Casullo is an American philosopher and Professor of Philosophy at the University of Nebraska–Lincoln. Casullo is known for his works on a priori knowledge, modal knowledge and intuitions.

== Books ==
- A Priori Justification, New York: Oxford University Press, 2003
- Essays on A Priori Knowledge and Justification, New York: Oxford University Press, 2012
- A Priori Knowledge (ed.), The International Research Library of Philosophy, Aldershot: Ashgate, 1999
- The A Priori In Philosophy, edited with Joshua Thurow, Oxford: Oxford University Press, 2013
